The 2004 Nabire earthquake occurred on November 26 in Papua, Indonesia. The strike-slip event had a moment magnitude of 7.1 and a maximum Mercalli intensity of VIII (Severe). Total deaths for the event amounted to 32, and the total number of injured (as reported by various agencies) was 130–213.

Damage
Dozens of buildings collapsed and nearly two hundred homes, businesses, and a church were lost. Some infrastructure was damaged, including three bridges and a government telecommunications building.

See also 
 List of earthquakes in 2004
 List of earthquakes in Indonesia

References

External links
Report on the Nabire Earthquake on 26 November 2004  – Asia Disaster Reduction Center
M7.1 - Papua, Indonesia – United States Geological Survey
INDONESIA:NABIRE EARTHQUAKE – IFRC

2004 disasters in Indonesia
Earthquakes in Indonesia
2004 earthquakes
2004 in Indonesia
November 2004 events in Asia
Papua (province)